Stephen James “Steve” Chapman (born February 25, 1954) is an American opinion journalist and nationally syndicated columnist.

Early life and education
Chapman was born in Brady, Texas and grew up in Midland and Austin, graduating from A.N. McCallum High School. He attended Harvard College, where he was on the staff of The Harvard Crimson,  and graduated cum laude in 1976.

Career
Chapman was a staff writer and associate editor of The New Republic magazine from 1978 to 1981. He joined the editorial board of the Chicago Tribune in 1981 and began writing a twice-a-week opinion column on national and international affairs in 1982. His column is syndicated by Creators Syndicate. He took a buyout from the Tribune in 2021.

Media critic Jack Shafer has described him as “a polymath, a creative policy wonk, a tap-dancing writer, a true son of liberty, (and) a failed Christian,” noting his “pro-gun, antigovernment, pro-peace, anti-drug-war, pro-market views.”

Chapman has described his political views as “moderate libertarian.”

Personal life
Chapman has two sons and a daughter from his first marriage. He married Cyn Sansing Mycoskie in 2007 and has three stepsons.

Bibliography

References

American libertarians
American male journalists
American columnists
Harvard College alumni
Slate (magazine) people
The Harvard Crimson people
1954 births
Living people